Falher is a town in the Peace Country area of Alberta, Canada. It is located in the Municipal District of Smoky River No. 130, along Highway 49. Falher is one of the earliest agricultural communities in the Peace River Country and is notable for its sizable francophone population.

History 

The area was known to missionaries before it was surveyed in 1909 as an Indian trail that led to British Columbia and where the Edmonton, Dunvegan and British Columbia Railway later laid its tracks. In 1912, the settlement of Mission St-Jean Baptiste de Falher was opened  from the current location of the Town of Falher. When the railway came to the area in 1915, the settlement was named after Father Constant Falher (March 29, 1863 – March 18, 1939), a Roman Catholic Oblate missionary who was born in Josselin, France, arriving at Grouard in 1889. The origin of the majority of local colonizers were from Quebec; some arriving in the area via the United States of America (French American), such as Robert Goulet's family, who settled in Girouxville.

The colony was divided into two: what is now the Village of Donnelly and the Town of Falher. In 1919, the town consolidated a school district and the first parish of Ste. Anne was established. The first post office opened in 1923 when the settlement became a hamlet. It incorporated as a village in 1929 and then as a town in 1955.

In 1963, a celebration of the 50 year anniversary of the settlement of Falher was organized by the regional ACFA, with attendance reaching 'more than 5000'.

Demographics 

In the 2016 Census of Population conducted by Statistics Canada, the Town of Falher recorded a population of 1,047 living in 450 of its 482 total private dwellings, a  change from its 2011 population of 1,075.

Economy 
The principal industries in the area are agriculture, forestry, oil and gas.

Established in 1973 as a private business, Falher Alfalfa (an alfalfa processing facility) was sold to a group of producers and farmers in 1978 with the same company. Under normal circumstances, Falher Alfalfa employed a staff of about 35 full-time employees in the spring and 110 at the busiest time of the season. Falher Alfalfa went under the Company Creditor Arrangement Act in June 2007, protecting the company against any legal action taken by creditors and gave the company a chance to sell its product to be able to repay creditors. In spring 2008, Falher Alfalfa declared bankruptcy due to production costs.

Government 
The Town of Falher is governed by a mayor (Donna Buchinski) and five councillors who meet on the second Monday of each month.  It is currently located in the riding of Peace River—Westlock federally.

Arts and culture 
Beginning in 1970, each June, the Falher Honey Festival is held to pay tribute to the beekeeping industry which has created an impact in the Smoky River region and throughout Canada and the United States. The honey in the area is derived largely from clover seed operations. At its peak, more than 48,000 hives in the region produced 10 million pounds (4,500 t) of honey annually. Today the honey of the Smoky River Region is known worldwide.

Falher attracted national attention in 2006 due to its high standing in the "Kraft Hockeyville" contest, a coast-to-coast competition to elect the municipality that most embodies the spirit of Canada's national pastime.

Attractions 
Main Street Falher includes a large honey bee statue, as Falher is known as "Honey Capital of Canada". The Falher Recreational Complex boasts a hockey arena, a private gym and a curling rink. The arena is home to the Falher Pirates, a team within the East Division of the North Peace Hockey League.

Education 
There are two public schools in Falher:

École Héritage School is a Francophone school that is located in a building that once served as a college school  built by the Oblates in 1951. École Héritage currently has students in grades K–12.
École Routhier School is another educational institution in Falher. Routhier is an Anglophone and French immersion Elementary School which includes grades K–6.

Students in grades 7-12 attend classes at École Georges P. Vanier School in nearby Donnelly, Alberta.

Media 
Falher is home to a French-language radio station, CKRP-FM, a local newspaper, the Smoky River Express, and was previously served bi-weekly by an alternative newspaper, The Vault Magazine.

See also 
List of communities in Alberta
List of towns in Alberta

References

External links 

1923 establishments in Alberta
1926 disestablishments in Alberta
1929 establishments in Alberta
Franco-Albertan culture
Populated places established in 1912
Towns in Alberta